Susanne Alfvengren (born Susanne Irene Lund, 12 February 1959 in Visby, Gotland, Sweden) is a Swedish singer. In 1984, Susanne Alfvengren had a hit with När vi rör varann. Another of her hits was Magneter. She competed in Melodifestivalen 2009 with the song "Du är älskad där du går", which was knocked out from the contest after the semi-final. In 1986–1987, she scored a vocal duet hit with Mikael Rickfors, with "Som stormen river öppet hav". It peaked at number three on the Swedish Singles Chart.

Filmography
PS Sista sommaren (PS Last Summer), 1988

References

External links
 
Susanne Alfvengren website
Svensk Filmdatabas – Susanne Alfvengren

1959 births
Living people
People from Gotland
Swedish women singers
Swedish songwriters
Melodifestivalen contestants of 2009